Teleférico do Alemão was a gondola lift service operating in Rio de Janeiro, Brazil. The service opened on 7 July 2011 and closed in September 2016, following the withdrawal of state funding. The duration of a single ride from start to finish was 16 minutes.

The service, announced as part of PAC 2 (the Brazilian federal funding program for infrastructure) consisted of a 2.1 mile gondola line running above the Complexo do Alemão group of favelas, and cost 210 million Brazilian reais to build. The decision to fund the construction of the line saw heavy criticism, with local media describing it as a vanity project, with the money potentially being better spent elsewhere. The system received 9000 riders daily whilst in operation.

History
The service was inaugurated by Brazilian President Dilma Rousseff, Rio de Janeiro State Governor Sérgio Cabral Filho and Rio de Janeiro City Mayor Eduardo Paes on 7 July 2011. Local residents could apply for a card granting them two free trips a day. 

Services were suspended in 2016 because the state couldn't pay the consortium anymore.

Services
The 152 gondolas took 16 minutes to traverse the 3.5 km route.

References

2011 establishments in Brazil
Transport in Rio de Janeiro (city)
Aerial tramways in Brazil
Transport infrastructure completed in 2011